The Cape Coral Bridge is a bridge located in Southwest Florida. It spans the Caloosahatchee River connecting McGregor and Cape Coral.

History
The original span opened for traffic on March 14, 1964, with one lane in each direction. In 1989, a second parallel span opened south of the first span, with two lanes for eastbound traffic, and westbound traffic using both lanes on the original span.  In conjunction with the new eastbound span, a four lane overpass was constructed over the intersection of State Road 867 (McGregor Boulevard) just east of the bridge.

The Cape Coral Bridge was the only link between Fort Myers and Cape Coral until 1997, when the Midpoint Memorial Bridge opened just north of the Cape Coral Bridge on the Caloosahatchee River.

The bridge is owned by the Lee County Department of Transportation. There is currently a two dollar toll in effect for westbound vehicles only, and there is no tolls for eastbound traffic. Florida's statewide SunPass prepaid electronic toll collection system is accepted on the Cape Coral Bridge, along with Lee County's "Leeway" prepaid toll system, which is also used on the Midpoint Bridge, and the Sanibel Causeway. However, there is a variable pricing scheme in effect.

Future
There are currently plans to renovate the Cape Coral Bridge, which includes rebuilding the westbound Cape Coral Bridge, widen the bridge to 3 lanes on both direction, allow pedestrian access to the bridge, improve bicycle lanes and improve the intersection between Cape Coral Parkway and Del Prado Boulevard. The project is expected to begin in 2026.

References

Toll bridges in Florida
Bridges completed in 1964
Bridges completed in 1989
Buildings and structures in Fort Myers, Florida
Road bridges in Florida
Bridges over the Caloosahatchee River
Cape Coral, Florida
Transportation in Fort Myers, Florida
Concrete bridges in the United States
Girder bridges in the United States
Bridges in Lee County, Florida
1964 establishments in Florida